Indonesia competed at the 2020 Summer Olympics in Tokyo. Originally scheduled to take place from 24 July to 9 August 2020, the Games were rescheduled for 23 July to 8 August 2021, due to the COVID-19 pandemic. It was the nation's sixteenth appearance at the Summer Olympics.

At the Games, Indonesia sent 28 athletes; the similar total with 2016 Summer Olympics. It consisted of 16 men and 12 women, competing in 8 sports. Twenty-five Indonesians had qualified to compete, while two swimmers and one female sprinter obtained their spots through wild card entries. In this edition, surfing made its Olympic debut  (as new sport) by Rio Waida, who became the nation's de facto flag bearer at the opening ceremony.

The Indonesian roster featured seven returning Olympians, with three of them headed to their third Games: badminton shuttler Greysia Polii in the women's doubles badminton, 2008 Olympic gold medalist Hendra Setiawan in men's doubles badminton together with his partner Mohammad Ahsan, two-time Olympian Praveen Jordan in mixed doubles badminton, three-time Olympic bronze and silver medalists Eko Yuli Irawan in weightlifting, three-time Olympian Deni in weightlifting, and two-time Olympian Riau Ega Agatha in archery.

Indonesia left Tokyo with five medals (one gold, one silver and three bronzes), improving its total medal tally from the previous Olympics. Greysia Polii and Apriyani Rahayu, who won the women's doubles event of badminton, are the country's only gold medalists. Their victory made Indonesia the second country after China to have won gold medals in all five disciplines of badminton at the Olympics. At 33 years and 356 days of age, Polii also became the oldest female badminton player to win an Olympic gold medal.

Medalists

| width="78%" align="left" valign="top"|  

 
| width="22%" align="left" valign="top"|

| width="22%" align="left" valign="top"|

| width="22%" align="left" valign="top" |

Background

Administration
On 31 December 2019, Roslan Roeslani was officially appointed as the Chef de Mission of the Indonesian Team for Tokyo 2020 Summer Olympics by the President of the Indonesian Olympic Committee, Raja Sapta Oktohari.

Opening ceremony
During the Parade of Nations, flag bearer Rio Waida wore a Balinese traditional attire - Payas Madya to represent his current home town and a pair of Tatami sandals to represent Japan as his second home and the host of the Olympics.

Broadcasters

Competitors
The following is the list of number of competitors in the Games.

Archery

Three Indonesian archers qualified for the men's events by securing the last of three quota places available in the team recurve at the 2021 WA Final Qualification Tournament in Paris, France. Another Indonesian archer captured a silver medal in the women's individual recurve to book an outright berth available at the 2018 Asian Games in Jakarta.

Athletics

Indonesian athletes further achieved the entry standards, either by qualifying time or by world ranking, in the following track and field events (up to a maximum of 3 athletes in each event):

Track & road events

Badminton

Indonesia entered eleven badminton players (seven men and four women) for each of the following events into the Olympic tournament based on the BWF World Race to Tokyo Rankings; two entries each in the men's singles and doubles and one each in the women's singles, women's doubles, and mixed doubles.

Men

Women

Mixed

Rowing

Indonesia qualified one boat in the women's lightweight double sculls for the Games by finishing fourth in the A-final and securing the last of three berths available at the 2021 FISA Asia & Oceania Olympic Qualification Regatta in Tokyo, Japan. 

Qualification Legend: FA=Final A (medal); FB=Final B (non-medal); FC=Final C (non-medal); FD=Final D (non-medal); FE=Final E (non-medal); FF=Final F (non-medal); SA/B=Semi-finals A/B; SC/D=Semi-finals C/D; SE/F=Semi-finals E/F; QF=Quarter-finals; R=Repechage

Shooting

For the first time since 2012, Indonesia entered one shooter after achieved quota places for the following events by virtue of their best finishes at the 2018 ISSF World Championships, the 2019 ISSF World Cup series, and Asian Championships, as long as they obtained a minimum qualifying score (MQS) by May 31, 2020.

Surfing

Indonesia sent one surfer to compete in the men's shortboard at the Games. Rio Waida accepted a spare berth previously allocated by Japan's Shun Murakami, as a runner-up in the provisional rankings from the Asian zone at the 2019 ISA World Surfing Games.

Qualification Legend: Q= Qualified directly for the third round; q = Qualified for the second round

Swimming

Indonesia received a universality invitation from FINA to send two top-ranked swimmers (one per gender) in their respective individual events to the Olympics, based on the FINA Points System of June 28, 2021.

Weightlifting

Indonesia entered five weightlifters into the Olympic competition. 2018 world champion, three-time Olympian, and triple medalist Eko Yuli Irawan (men's 61 kg), 2019 Southeast Asian Games champion and two-time Olympian, Deni (men's 67 kg), 2020 world junior champion Windy Cantika Aisah (women's 49 kg), and Nurul Akmal (women's +87 kg) secured one of the top eight slots each in their respective weight divisions based on the IWF Absolute World Rankings, with 2019 Asian junior champion Rahmat Erwin Abdullah  topping the field of weightlifters from the Asian zone in the men's 73 kg category based on the IWF Absolute Continental Rankings.

Windy Cantika Aisah claimed the first medal for Indonesia contingent after winning the bronze medal in the women's 49 kg event with 194 kg lift in total.

Notes

See also
 Indonesia at the Olympics
 Indonesia at the Paralympics
 Indonesia at the 2020 Summer Paralympics

References

Nations at the 2020 Summer Olympics
2020
2021 in Indonesian sport